Fuckin A is the second album by American band The Thermals, released on May 18, 2004 by Sub Pop Records.

A rare promo pressing exists of the planned (but later scrapped) "God and Country" single. It was meant to promote the live album Live @ the Echoplex: December 7th, 2007 and Fuckin A from four years prior. "Goddamn the Light" served as the single's b-side.

Track listing
Source: Official Site

Personnel

The Thermals
Hutch Harris - Guitar/Vocals
Kathy Foster - Bass/Backing Vocals
Jordan Hudson - Drums

Additional Personnel
Ed Brooks - Mastering
Rick Fisher - Mastering
Troy Tietjen - Assistant Engineer
Chris Walla - Engineer

References

2004 albums
Sub Pop albums
The Thermals albums